Hasib (also spelled Haseeb, Hasip, Hassib or Hasyb) is an Arabic masculine given name meaning "noble", "respected" or "reckoner".

The name is mentioned in the Quran as Al-Hasib, translated as The Bringer of Judgement, one of the Names of God in Islam. The name is sometimes styled Abdul-Hasib; the prefix Abdul meaning servant, denoting subservience to God.

Given name
Notable people with the given name include:
 Haseeb Ahsan, Pakistani cricketer
 Haseeb Drabu, Kashmiri politician
 Haseeb Hameed, English cricketer
 Haseeb Hassan, Pakistani film director
 Hasibul Hossain, Bangladeshi cricketer
 Hasib Hussain, British terrorist and perpetrator of the 7/7 attacks
 Mehmed Hasib Pasha, Ottoman statesman
 Hasip Pektas, Turkish illustrator
 Hasib Sabbagh, Palestinian businessman
 Haseeb Shehada, Israeli scholar

Fictional characters
Hasib Karim al-Din, character from One Thousand and One Nights

Arabic masculine given names
Afghan masculine given names
Bosniak masculine given names
Given names
Iranian masculine given names
Pakistani masculine given names
Turkish masculine given names